Gozón is a municipality in the Autonomous Community of the Principality of Asturias, Spain. Its capital is the town of Luanco (also called Lluanco). The Cantabrian Sea lies on its northern edge, and it is bordered to the south by Corvera de Asturias, to the west by Avilés, and to the east by Carreño.

The municipality is a fishing port, and the location of the Cabo de Peñas (Cape of Boulders).

Toponymy
In decree 72/2005 of July 7, 2005, published in the Boletin Oficial del Principado de Asturias (BOPA; official bulletin of the Principality of Asturias) granted the Asturian forms of the municipal place names official status for all uses, with the exception of the capital Lluanco/Luanco, which maintains a bilingual name. Therefore, with this exception, the Asturian names are the only ones which can appear on road signs and official maps.

Climate
As with the rest of Asturias' populated areas, Gozón has a marine climate with a narrow average high temperature range between  – . For the nearest weather station see the weather data for Gijón.

Main sights 
 Church  of Santa María built in the  18th century
 Palace Menéndez de la Pola
  The Clock Tower, dating from 1705
 Mansion Valdés Pola
 Mansion Mori'
 Palace of Manzaneda, from 1700

Parishes

References

External links

Federación Asturiana de Concejos 
Asociación de Turismo Rural del Cabo Peñas "El Faro"  

Municipalities in Asturias